Ankang Wa Ethnic Township is an ethnic township in Lancang Lahu Autonomous County, Yunnan, China.

Administrative division
As of 2016, the township is divided into five villages: 
 Shangzhai 
Ankang 
Nanshan 
Nuobo 
Xiaobanba

Geography
Ankang Wa Ethnic Township is situated at northwestern Lancang Lahu Autonomous County. The township is bordered to the northwest by Cangyuan Va Autonomous County, to the east and southeast by Shangyun Town, to the south by Mujia Township, and to the west by Xuelin Wa Ethnic Township.

Economy
The township's economy is based on nearby mineral resources and agricultural resources. Commercial crops include tea, sugarcane, and walnut. The region abounds with iron, lead, and tin.

Transportation
The National Highway G214 passes across the township north to south.

References

Bibliography

Townships of Pu'er City
Divisions of Lancang Lahu Autonomous County